The European Marian Network connects twenty Catholic Marian sanctuaries in Europe (as many as the number of decades in the Rosary). It was established in 2003, promoted by the Holy See.

Only one sanctuary per country (the best known) was chosen. The sanctuaries, and their devotions, are the following:
 Chapel of the Miraculous Image in Altötting, Germany
 Our Lady of Banneux in Banneux, Belgium
 Shrine of Mary Help of Christians in Brezje, Slovenia
 Our Lady of Csíksomlyó in Șumuleu Ciuc, Romania 
 Our Lady of Częstochowa in Częstochowa, Poland
 The Black Madonna of the Einsiedeln Abbey in Einsiedeln, Switzerland
 Our Lady of Fátima in Fátima, Portugal
 Shrine of Our Lady of Europe in Gibraltar 
 Our Lady of Knock in Knock, Ireland
 Mariánska hora in Levoča, Slovakia
 Basilica della Santa Casa in Loreto, Italy
 Sanctuary of Our Lady of Lourdes in Lourdes, France
 Our Lady of Máriapócs in Máriapócs, Hungary
 Basilica of the Birth of the Virgin Mary in Mariazell, Austria
 Mary of the Snows in Marija Bistrica, Croatia
 Sanctuary of Our Lady of Mellieħa in Mellieħa, Malta
 Our Lady of the Gate of Dawn in Vilnius, Lithuania
 Our Lady of Walsingham in Walsingham, United Kingdom 
 Cathedral-Basilica of Our Lady of the Pillar in Zaragoza, Spain
 Theotokos of Zarvanytsia in Zarvanytsia, Ukraine

The Sanctuary Animators from the members of the Network meet each year to get to know each other better and, above all, to understand better the needs of the millions of pilgrims and visitors who frequent these Sanctuaries. The gathering in 2003 took place in Lourdes, in 2004 it took place in Fátima, in 2005 it took place in Máriapócs, in 2006 in Sanctuary of Our Lady of Knock, in 2007 in Vilnius, in 2008 in Zaragoza and in 2009 in Częstochowa. 2010 took place in Gibraltar, 2011 was in Walsingham, 2012 was in Rome and in 2013, it took place in Mellieħa

See also
Shrines to the Virgin Mary
Titles of Mary

References

Catholic Mariology
Catholic Church-related lists